Adrián González Mendoza (born 23 June 2003) is a professional footballer who plays as a midfielder for USL Championship club LA Galaxy II. Born in the United States, he represented the Mexico national under-19 team.

Career

Youth
After drawing reported interest from clubs in Spain, Mexico and the United States, González joined the Pachuca academy in December 2018. He soon returned to the United States to join the LA Galaxy academy in 2019. In 2020, González played with LA Galaxy's USL Championship side LA Galaxy II.

Professional
In April 2021, LA Galaxy II announced that it had signed González to a professional contract ahead of the 2021 season.

International career
Born in the United States to Mexican parents, González is eligible to represent both the United States and Mexico internationally. He has represented the latter at the under-16 and under-17 levels.

Personal
Adrián's older brother is Jonathan González.

Notes

References

External links
 LA Galaxy USSDA profile
 

2003 births
Living people
American sportspeople of Mexican descent
Mexican footballers
Soccer players from California
Sportspeople from Santa Rosa, California
Association football midfielders
LA Galaxy II players
USL Championship players
Mexico youth international footballers
Mexican expatriate footballers
Expatriate soccer players in the United States
Mexican expatriate sportspeople in the United States